Joseph V. Sakran is an American trauma surgeon, public health researcher, gun violence prevention advocate and activist. His career in medicine and trauma surgery was sparked after nearly being killed at the age of 17 when he was shot in the throat. He is currently an assistant professor of surgery at the Johns Hopkins University, Director of Emergency General Surgery at Johns Hopkins Hospital. He also serves as the Associate Chief for the Division of Acute Care Surgery.

Early life and education 
Sakran was born in Falls Church, Virginia to immigrant parents. He attended high school in Burke, Virginia. As a high school senior, at a local playground after attending a football game at Lake Braddock Secondary School, he was struck in the neck from a stray bullet fired into a crowd. With his windpipe ruptured and carotid artery severed, he was saved by trauma surgeon Dr. Robert Ahmed and vascular surgeon Dr. Dipankar Mukherjee at Inova Fairfax Hospital. Dedicating himself to become a surgeon while still in recovery, he attended George Mason University and gained experience as a medic and firefighter at the City of Fairfax Fire & Rescue Department.

Sakran earned an undergraduate degree in biology and minor in chemistry from George Mason University in 1999. He graduated with a Doctor of Medicine from Ben-Gurion University of the Negev Medical School for International Health in 2005, and earned a Master of Public health from the Johns Hopkins Bloomberg School of Public Health in 2003. He also holds a Master of Public Administration from the Harvard Kennedy School of Government. He completed his general surgery residency training at Inova Fairfax Hospital, and then fellowship at the University of Pennsylvania in Traumatology, Surgical Critical Care, and Emergency General Surgery.

Advocacy 
In 2016, Sakran's activism first achieved national recognition when he founded Doctors for Hillary, supporting the candidacy of Hillary Clinton, who had made reduction of gun violence in America a central tenet of her campaign. He was recognized by Secretary Clinton for his work in fighting to end gun violence.

His research in public health and specifically firearm injury prevention has been recognized by the Agency for Healthcare Research and Quality (AHRQ) and Academy Health. A recent study published in Health Affairs, Emergency Department Visits for Firearm-Related Injuries in the United States, 2006-14 was given an honorable mention as one of the 2017 Outstanding Article of the Year Award by Health Cost and Utilization Project (HCUP).

On November 7, 2018 the National Rifle Association's comment telling doctors to "stay in their lane" resulted in response on Twitter from Sakran, telling them that "As a Trauma Surgeon and survivor of #GunViolence I cannot believe the audacity of the @NRA to make such a divisive statement. We take care of these patients every day. Where are you when I’m having to tell all those families their loved one has died". The tweet went viral and resulted in a robust response from healthcare professionals. A few days later Sakran established the Twitter account @ThisIsOurLane as a way to unite the medical community who care for gun violence victims.

Sakran has also written numerous opinion pieces for The Atlantic and CNN. He was also interviewed on NPR by Terry Gross, the host and co-executive producer of Fresh Air, on November 28, 2018.

In February 2019, Congressman Mike Thompson (D-CA), Chairman of the Gun Violence Prevention Task Force invited Sakran as his guest to the State of the Union, recognizing his commitment to ending gun violence as both a survivor and now trauma surgeon.

On February 6, 2019, Congressman Jerrold Nadler (D-NY) and Chairman of the House Judiciary Committee invited Sakran to testify at the hearing on Preventing Gun Violence.

In 2019, Sakran was also selected for the Presidential Leadership Scholars program, where his project focused on safe storage of firearms. In the same year, Sakran was selected as one of the Robert Wood Johnson Foundation Health Policy Fellows by the National Academy of Medicine. He is currently working on health-related legislative and regulatory issues.

In early 2020, Sakran tweeted a photo of a flyer showing a clipart style hand holding a gun, which was a flyer left under his windshield wiper.

Media 
2018: Featured in CNN, "Victim of gun violence returns to the E.R., this time as the surgeon"
2018: Featured in MSNBC, "Dr. Joseph Sakran On Gun Violence: We Are Facing A Public Health Crisis"
2018: Featured in CNN Town Hall with Chris Cuomo, "Armas de fuego: ¿Enfrenta Estados Unidos una crisis de salud pública?"
2018: "CNN Interview Dr. Joseph Sakran; Gun violence victim responses to NRA"
2019: House Judiciary Testimony
2019: Story in the Public Square
2019: Featured in The Atlantic, "Why Doctors Are Taking on the NRA"

Selected publications

References

External links 
Official profile

People from Fairfax, Virginia
21st-century American physicians
Living people
George Mason University alumni
Ben-Gurion University of the Negev alumni
Gun control advocates
Harvard Kennedy School alumni
Johns Hopkins University alumni
American firefighters
1977 births